The International Lutheran Council (ILC) is a worldwide association of confessional Lutheran denominations. Member bodies of the ILC hold "an unconditional commitment to the Holy Scriptures as the inspired and infallible Word of God and to the Lutheran Confessions contained in the Book of Concord as the true and faithful exposition of the Word of God." The member church bodies are not required to be in church-fellowship with one another, though many of them are. 

The organization was constituted in 1993 at a council held in Antigua, Guatemala, although it traces its roots back to theological conferences held in various locations during the 1950s and 1960s. It is to be distinguished from the Lutheran World Federation (LWF) and the Confessional Evangelical Lutheran Conference.

The council has 54 participating churches as of 2018. Among its larger members are the Malagasy Lutheran Church, the Lutheran Church–Missouri Synod (LCMS), the Evangelical Lutheran Church of Brazil, and the Lutheran Church—Canada. Altogether, approximately 7,150,000 adherents belong to ILC member churches.

The council's chairman is Bishop Hans-Jörg Voigt of the Independent Evangelical Lutheran Church, Germany. The executive secretary is Albert B. Collver III of the LCMS. Delegates to the ILC meet every two years.

The organization has not accepted the Joint Declaration on the Doctrine of Justification, an agreement reached by the Catholic Church's Pontifical Council for Promoting Christian Unity (PCPCU) and the Lutheran World Federation, in 1999. However, the ILC has been involved in dialogue with the PCPCU, with a final report released on 30 November 2021.

History
The origins of the ILC go back to a meeting at Uelzen, Germany, in July 1952 by Lutherans who were not happy with the theological course being taken by the Lutheran World Federation. Among the participants were delegates from the Lutheran Church–Missouri Synod who had been observers at the LWF assembly in Hannover. Other delegates were present from churches affiliated with the LCMS from Germany, Australia, Denmark, and the United Kingdom. Two further meetings were held, in Oakland, California, in 1958 and in Cambridge, England, in August 1963. At the latter meeting it was decided to create a permanent organization, a "Continuation Committee", to act for the group in between meetings, which were now dubbed International Lutheran Theological Conferences. The committee was also tasked with publishing a theological journal and a committee bulletin, and with facilitating exchanges of pastors, theological professors, and students. However, the meeting explicitly disclaimed it was founding a group in opposition to the LWF.
 
Five more "theological conferences" were held until the name was shortened to International Lutheran Conference at the Eighth Conference in Porto Alegre, Rio Grande do Sul, Brazil. Resolutions passed during this period described the ILC as a partnership, forum, or "group of independent Lutheran churches". At the Fifteenth Conference in Antigua, Guatemala, the group decided on creating a more formal structure as an association of churches and adopted a set of Guiding Principles that would serve as a constitution and theological point of reference. The "Continuation Committee" was replaced by an "Executive Council".
 
At the 2018 World Conference meeting, held in Antwerp, Belgium, on 25–26 September 2018, the ILC voted to admit 17 new church bodies, 11 as full members and 6 as associate members. This increased the church members of ILC to 54 and their faithful to 7.15 million members.
 
At the 2022 World Conference meeting, the Evangelical Lutheran Church of Latvia was accepted as a full member. It had already been accepted as an observer member in February 2022.

World Conferences of the International Lutheran Council
The World Conference of the International Lutheran Council is a official meeting ordinarily held every three years. They are hosted by a church body whose invitation is accepted in the previous Conference.

At the 23rd conference, the association unanimously adopted the statement "Same-Gender Relationships and the Church", which defined the practice of homosexuality as a sin.

Members
By country in alphabetical order

Full members

 Argentina
Evangelical Lutheran Church of Argentina (Iglesia Evangélica Luterana Argentina)
 Belgium
Evangelical Lutheran Church in Belgium (Evangelisch-Lutherse Kerk in België)
Benin
Lutheran Church in Africa—Benin Synod
 Bolivia
Christian Evangelical Lutheran Church of Bolivia (Iglesia Cristiana Evangélica Luterana de Bolivia) - also a member of the Global Confessional and Missional Lutheran Forum
 Brazil
Evangelical Lutheran Church of Brazil (Igreja Evangélica Luterana do Brasil)
 Burkina Faso
Evangelical Lutheran Church of Burkina Faso
 Canada
Lutheran Church—Canada
 Chile
Evangelical Lutheran Church of the Republic of Chile (Iglesia Evangélica Luterana de la República de Chile)
 China (Hong Kong SAR)
Lutheran Church—Hong Kong Synod (香港路德會)
 China, Republic of (Taiwan)
China Evangelical Lutheran Church (中華福音道路德會)
 Denmark
Evangelical Lutheran Free Church of Denmark (Den evangelisk-lutherske Frikirke i Danmark) https://www.vivit.dk
 Finland
Evangelical Lutheran Mission Diocese of Finland (Finnish: Suomen evankelisluterilainen lähetyshiippakunta, Swedish: Evangelisk-lutherska missionsstiftet i Finland)
 France
Evangelical Lutheran Church-Synod of France (Église Évangélique Luthérienne - Synode de France)
 Germany
Independent Evangelical—Lutheran Church (Selbständige Evangelisch - Lutherische Kirche)
 Ghana
Evangelical Lutheran Church of Ghana - also a full member of the Lutheran World Federation
 Guatemala
Lutheran Church of Guatemala (Consejo Luterano Iglesia Luterana en Guatemala)
 Haiti
Evangelical Lutheran Church of Haiti (Eglise Evangelique Lutherienne D'Haiti)
 India
India Evangelical Lutheran Church - also a full member of the Lutheran World Federation
 Japan
Japan Lutheran Church (日本ルーテル教団) - also an associate member of the Lutheran World Federation
 Kenya
Evangelical Lutheran Church in Kenya - also a full member of the Lutheran World Federation and a member of the Global Confessional and Missional Lutheran Forum
 Korea, South
Lutheran Church in Korea (기독교한국루터회) - also a full member of the Lutheran World Federation
Liberia
Evangelical Lutheran Church of Liberia
Madagascar
Malagasy Lutheran Church - also a full member of the Lutheran World Federation
 Mexico
Lutheran Synod of Mexico (Sinodo Luterano de Mexico)
 Nicaragua
Lutheran Church Synod of Nicaragua (Iglesia Luterana Sínodo de Nicaragua)
 Nigeria
Lutheran Church of Nigeria
 Norway
Lutheran Church in Norway (Den Lutherske Kirke i Norge)
Evangelical Lutheran Diocese of Norway (Det evangelisk-lutherske stift i Norge)
 Papua New Guinea
Gutnius Lutheran Church
 Paraguay
Evangelical Lutheran Church of Paraguay (Iglesia Evangélica Luterana del Paraguay)
Peru
Evangelical Lutheran Church - Peru (Iglesia Evangélica Luterana - Perú) - also a member of the Global Confessional and Missional Lutheran Forum Note: this is not the same Lutheran denomination like Iglesia Evangélica Luterana en el Perú, known as Christuskirche, member of the Lutheran World Federation).
 Philippines
Lutheran Church in the Philippines - also a full member of the Lutheran World Federation
 Portugal
Portuguese Evangelical Lutheran Church
 Russia
Evangelical Lutheran Church of Ingria in Russia (Евангелическая-лютеранская Церковь ИНГРИИ) - also a full member of the Lutheran World Federation
Siberian Evangelical Lutheran Church (Сибирская Евангелическо-Лютеранская Церковь)
 South Africa
Free Evangelical Lutheran Synod in South Africa
Lutheran Church in Southern Africa
Spain
Spanish Evangelical Lutheran Church (IELE)
 Sri Lanka
Ceylon Evangelical Lutheran Church, replacement body for the Lanka Lutheran Church - also a full member of the Lutheran World Federation
Sweden
The Mission Province (Missionsprovinsen) - also a member of the Global Confessional and Missional Lutheran Forum
Togo
Lutheran Church of Togo
Uganda
Lutheran Church of Uganda
 United Kingdom
Evangelical Lutheran Church of England
 United States of America
Lutheran Church–Missouri Synod
American Association of Lutheran Churches
Lutheran Ministerium and Synod – USA
Uruguay
Lutheran Church of Uruguay
 Venezuela
Lutheran Church of Venezuela (Iglesia Luterana de Venezuela)

Associate members
 Australia
Lutheran Church of Australia - also an associate member of the Lutheran World Federation
Indonesia
Indonesian Lutheran Christian Church - also a member of the Global Confessional and Missional Lutheran Forum
Myanmar (Burma)
Myanmar Lutheran Church - also a full member of the Lutheran World Federation
Rwanda
Lutheran Mission in Africa—Synod of Thousand Hills
South Africa
St. Peter Confessional Lutheran Synod of South Africa
South Sudan
South Sudan Evangelical Lutheran Church
Taiwan
The Lutheran Church of the Republic of China - also a full member of the Lutheran World Federation

See also

List of Lutheran denominations
Global Confessional and Missional Lutheran Forum

References

External links

 
International bodies of Lutheran denominations
Christian organizations established in 1993
International bodies of Lutheran denominations (currently existing)